Lentaria is a genus of fungi in the family Lentariaceae. The genus has a widespread distribution and contains 17 species. It was circumscribed by British mycologist Edred John Henry Corner in 1950.

Many members are important decomposers in forest ecosystems. Samples of the genus were collected in China and studies using molecular and morphological methods. Five of the species collected were described as new species

Species
Lentaria afflata
Lentaria boletosporioides
Lentaria byssiseda
Lentaria caribbeana
Lentaria epichnoa
Lentaria glaucosiccescens
Lentaria javanica
Lentaria micheneri
Lentaria patouillardii
Lentaria rionegrensis
Lentaria surculus

References
Liu, L.-N., Wu, L., Chen, Z.-H., Bau, T., & Zhang, P. (2017). The species of Lentaria (Gomphales, basidiomycota) from China based on morphological and molecular evidence. Mycological Progress, 16(6), 605–612. https://doi.org/10.1007/s11557-017-1284-2

Gomphales
Taxa named by E. J. H. Corner
Taxa described in 1950